The 1959–60 Chicago Black Hawks season was the Hawks' 34th season in the NHL, and the club was coming off of a third-place finish in 1958–59, as they finished the season with a club record 28 wins, and tying a club record with 69 points, and earned their first playoff berth since 1953.  Chicago then lost to the Montreal Canadiens in the first round, losing in six games.

Regular season
After winning the season opener, the Black Hawks would struggle, going on a 14-game winless streak to fall into last place in the league.  Chicago would snap out of their slump, and in their next 26 games, the Hawks would have a record of 11–10–5, bringing them back into the playoff race with the Boston Bruins, New York Rangers, and Detroit Red Wings.  The Black Hawks would then get very hot, posting a record of 16–8–5 in their remaining 29 games to finish the season with a 28–29–13 record, which was identical to the previous season, and once again finish in third place in the league, earning a playoff spot.  This was the first time since the 1940–41 and 1941–42 seasons that the Black Hawks had consecutive playoff appearances.

Offensively, Chicago was led by Bobby Hull, who scored a team record 39 goals, and finished at the top of the NHL scoring race with a club record 81 points, winning the Art Ross Trophy.  Rookie Bill Hay finished second to Hull in team scoring, earning 18 goals and 55 points, and winning the Calder Memorial Trophy.  Tod Sloan had another solid season, scoring 20 goals and 40 points.  Pierre Pilote led the defense, scoring 7 goals and 45 points, while Stan Mikita led the club with 110 penalty minutes.

In goal, Glenn Hall played in all 70 games, winning 28 of them, while posting a 2.56 GAA, and earning 6 shutouts.

Season standings

Record vs. opponents

Game log

Regular season

Playoffs
Chicago would face the Montreal Canadiens in the best of seven NHL semi-final for the second consecutive season.  The Canadiens finished the season with an NHL best 92 points, and had won four consecutive Stanley Cups.  The series opened up with two games at the Montreal Forum, and the Canadiens took a 2–0 series lead by winning both games by scores of 4–3, including an overtime win in the second game.  The series moved to Chicago Stadium for the next two games, however, it was the Canadiens who stayed hot, shutting out the Black Hawks 4–0 in the third game, followed by another shutout victory in the fourth game, as Montreal won the game 2–0, and swept the series in four games.

Montreal Canadiens 4, Chicago Black Hawks 0

Player stats

Regular season
Scoring leaders

Goaltending

Playoffs
Scoring leaders

Goaltending

Awards and records

Transactions

See also
 1959–60 NHL season

References

External links
 Hockey-Reference
 National Hockey League Guide & Record Book 2007

Chicago Blackhawks seasons
Chicago
Chicago